Theophilus de Garencières (1610–1680) was a French apothecary who spent most of his life practising in England.

Born in Paris, Garencières studied the prophecies of Nostradamus at an early age, and these had a lasting effect on him.  He studied at the University of Caen, which he left with a Doctorate of Medicine in 1636.  To avoid religious persecution, he moved to the University of Oxford during the 1640s, which finally granted him the same qualification in 1657.

Garencières first came to public attention in 1647, when he claimed that sugar was bad for the health.  He believed that it had a heating quality, which could cause "Tabes Anglica" of the lungs.

During the Great Plague, Garencières claimed to have a secret cure, and that nineteen of the twenty patients he had attended had recovered.  He wrote of his "discovery" in A mite cast into the treasury of the famous city of London, being a brief and methodical discourse of the nature, causes, symptomes, remedies and preservation from the plague, in this calamitous year, 1665, digested into aphorismes.  This book proved highly popular, seeing at least three editions inside a year.

While considering himself a Catholic, Garencières was a harsh critic of Pope Clement VIII, writing the endword to a work of 1670 entitled The famous conclave: wherein Clement VIII was elected Pope, with the intrigues and cunning devices of that ecclesiastical assembly: faithfully translated out of an Italian manuscript found in one of the cardinals studies after his death.

In 1672, Garencières was the first to translate Nostradamus into English, creating the bilingual text The true prophecies or prognostications of Michel Nostradamus. However, Garencières unknowingly used a fake edition of Nostradamus’s work, printed in 1649, which contained quatrains that were forged in order to discredit and foretell the downfall of Cardinal Jules Mazarin, prime minister of France. 

Also in 1672, Garencières wrote The Admirable Virtues, And Wonderful Effects Of The True And Genuine Tincture Of Coral, In Physick.  Soon afterwards, he met Thomas Britton, with whom he shared a love of the esoteric.  Britton designed him a mobile laboratory.

Garencières died in, or around, 1680.  A grandson of the same name became a vicar in Scarborough, while his son, who again shared the name, was a noted apothecary in York.

References

1610 births
1680 deaths
University of Caen Normandy alumni
Alumni of the University of Oxford
Nostradamus
Physicians from Paris
English apothecaries